Pebbles, Volume 6: Chicago Pt. 1, also known as Chicago 1, is a compilation album featuring American garage and psychedelic rock musical artists from the 1960s that were associated with the Chicago music scene. It is a compact disc installment of the Pebbles series, and was released on AIP Records in 1994 (see 1994 in music).

Included on the album are compositions recorded by lesser-known groups, grant an exception for the Buckinghams, associated with Chicago's burgeoning garage rock scene. Musical highlights included the opening track, "Searching", by the Omens, which was later covered by the Pandoras and Gravedigger V. The fuzz-toned raver, "I Want Her Back", by the Todds combine a raw intensity of garage rock with folk rock. Haymarket Riot's psychedelic-tinged "Trip on Out" advocated for the hippie lifestyle. Several personalized cover versions present on the album notably include a rendition of the psychedelic pop group the Lemon Drops' "I Live in the Springtime" by Buzzsaw, the Delights' recording of the Kingsmen's "Long Green", and a drastically demented version of "Jailhouse Rock" by Dean Carter.

Much of the material compiled on Pebbles, Volume 6: Chicago Pt. 1 is also available on the 1983 album Highs in the Mid-Sixties, Volume 4. The cover track listing does not correctly correlate with the sequence on the CD itself as the Huns' "Winning Ticket" is actually the third song; "Come with Me" by the Boyz and "Run Around" by the Cavedwellers are not featured on the CD; and the final track is a radio station promo. The following album in the Pebbles series, Pebbles, Volume 7: Chicago Pt. 2 also focuses on Chicago artists.

Track listing

 The Omens: "Searching"; Rel. 1966
 The Furniture: "I Love It Baby"; Rel. 1967
 Huns: "Winning Ticket"; Rel. 1966
 Buzzsaw : "I Live in the Springtime"; Rel. 1970
 The Todds: "I Want Her Back"; Rel. 1967
 The Group, Inc.: "Like a Woman"; Rel. 1966
 The Pattens: "Say Ma, Ma"
 Haymarket Riot: "Trip on Out"; Rel. 1968
 The Delights: "Long Green"; Rel. 1965
 The Untamed: "Someday Baby"; Rel. 1966
 Dalek/Engam: The Blackstones: "Never Feel The Pain"; Rel. 1965
 Dean Carter: "Rebel Woman"; Rel. 1967
 Shady Daze: "I'll Make You Pay"; Rel. 1967
 The Little Boy Blues: "You Don't Love Me"; Rel. 1967
 Nobody's Children: "Girl, I Need You"; Rel. 1967
 The Buckinghams: "I've Been Wrong"; Rel. 1966
 Last Knight: "Shadow of Fear"; Rel. 1968
 The End: "Memorandum"; Rel. 1966
 Dean Carter: "Jailhouse Rock"; Rel. 1967
 The Foggy Notions: "Need a Little Lovin'"; Rel. 1966
 Haymarket Riot: "Something Else"; Rel. 1968
 The Warner Brothers: "Please Mr. Sullivan"; Rel. 1965

References

Pebbles (series) albums
1994 compilation albums